Munger Lok Sabha constituency (formerly Monghyr) is one of the 40 Lok Sabha (parliamentary) constituencies in Bihar state in eastern India. Mokama and Barh are in the 14 assembly segments which fall under Patna district.

Assembly segments
Presently, Munger Lok Sabha constituency comprises the following six Vidhan Sabha (legislative assembly) segments:

Members of Parliament
The following is the list of the Members of Parliament elected from this Lok Sabha constituency.

^ by poll

Election results

General elections 2019

General elections 2014

General elections 2009

References

See also
 Munger
 Munger Fort
 Munger district
 Munger division
 List of Constituencies of the Lok Sabha

Lok Sabha constituencies in Bihar
Politics of Munger district
Politics of Lakhisarai district
Politics of Patna district